The Corona was a one-member ship of the line class, a 76-gun third rate. It was built in 1712 by the Venetian Arsenal, and was one of the bigger and better armed vessels of the Venetian Navy. Its guns were all made in bronze for prestige reasons. The ship, even if it was a well-made one, was not copied, and the Navy chose to skip to the cheaper Leon Trionfante class instead.

Notes
The Corona was the only Venetian sailing ship to embark 32-pounder guns, given that the following class' ships had the lighter 27-pounders.

References
Guido Ercole, Vascelli e fregate della Serenissima, GMT, Trento, 2011.

See also
Venetian Navy
Arsenal of Venice
Ottoman-Venetian War (1714-1718)
Ships of the line of the Venetian navy
Ship of the line classes
Ships built by the Venetian Arsenal
18th century in the Republic of Venice